John Lake may refer to:

John Lake (bishop) (1624–1689), bishop in the British Isles
John Henry Lake (1878–?), American cyclist who won a bronze medal at the 1900 Summer Olympics
John Lake (journalist) (born 1930), former sports editor of Newsweek who disappeared in 1967
John E. Lake (1845–1920), businessman and politician in Newfoundland
John G. Lake (1870–1935), businessman, missionary, and faith healer
John Neilson Lake (1834–1925), founding father of Saskatoon
John Lake (MP) for Exeter